{{DISPLAYTITLE:Times List of the 10 Best Graphic Novels}}
The Time's List of the 10 Best Graphic Novels''' is an unranked list of the 10 best graphic novels published between 1938 and 2006. The list was compiled by Time Magazine critic Lev Grossman.

Overview

The list of the period was published as a supplement to Times 100 Best Novels list, compiled by both Lev Grossman and Richard Lacayo. Watchmen (1986) by Alan Moore and Dave Gibbons appears on both the 100 Best Novels and 10 Best Graphic Novels lists, giving the combined lists a total of 109 entries. Additionally, Neil Gaiman is the only author to have more than one entry on the 10 Best Graphic Novels compilation: The Sandman (1989) and Miracleman: The Golden Age'' (1992).

List

See also
 ''Le Monde'''s 100 Books of the Century
 Time's All-Time 100 Movies
 Time's List of the 100 Best Novels

References

External links
 List Description at Time.com
 Full List at Time.com 
 List description of the 10 best Graphic Novels at Time.com

Time (magazine) 100 Lists
Lists of novels
Top book lists